Ernst Fiedler (1861–1954) was a Swiss (German born) mathematician.

Life and work 
Fiedler was the son of Wilhelm Fiedler, mathematics professor at ETH Zurich from 1867. From 1879 to 1882 he studied mathematics at ETH Zurich; in 1882 he moved to Berlin where he studied under Weierstrass, Frobenius and other outstanding mathematicians. In 1885 he moved to Leipzig, where he was awarded a doctorate under Felix Klein in 1885.

Returned to Zurich, he was privatdozent at ETH Zurich. In 1889 he was named full professor at the Industrieschule (in 1904 renamed as Oberrealschule, and now Kantonsschule Rämibühl). He was the principal of the school from 1904 to 1926 whem he retired.

Fiedler only produced some secondary school textbooks and any research paper. But he has left some lecture notes on courses given by his father and other professors like Weierstrass.

He also joined the Swiss Army and became the youngest colonel in the army. From 1889 he lectured on ballistics at the Polytechnicum. He was also member of a number of committees to improve the secondary schools.

References

Bibliography

External links 
 
 

1861 births
1954 deaths
19th-century Swiss mathematicians
20th-century Swiss mathematicians